Chlewiska  (Khlivyshcha) is a village in the administrative district of Gmina Narol, within Lubaczów County, Subcarpathian Voivodeship, in south-eastern Poland.

References

Chlewiska